Herman Bouwens (29 October 1868 – 22 July 1955) was a Dutch sports shooter. He competed in eight events at the 1920 Summer Olympics.

References

External links
 

1868 births
1955 deaths
Dutch male sport shooters
Olympic shooters of the Netherlands
Shooters at the 1920 Summer Olympics
People from Arcen en Velden
Sportspeople from Limburg (Netherlands)